Shweta Shinde is an Indian actress and producer, known for Lagira Zhala Ji's producer and Doctor Don. She launched Vajra Productions with Film director Sanjay Khambe in 2016.

Personal life 
Shweta Shinde married to Sandeep Bhansali in 2007. She has also one daughter.

Career 
She started her career with modelling and later she moved to act in films and daily soaps.

Filmography

References

External links 
 Official Website
 

21st-century Indian actresses
Living people
Indian soap opera actresses
Actresses in Marathi cinema
Marathi film directors
Actresses from Pune
Indian women film producers
21st-century Indian businesswomen
21st-century Indian businesspeople
Film directors from Maharashtra
Indian television producers
Year of birth missing (living people)